Virginia Lee Corbin (December 5, 1910 – June 4, 1942) was an American silent film actress.

Early years 
Corbin was born Laverne Virginia Corbin in Prescott, Arizona to Leon Ernest Corbin and Virginia Frances (Cox) Corbin, and she had a sister, Ruth Emilie (Corbin) Miehle De Vries Lipari.

Career 
Corbin began her career as a child actress in 1916, when she was billed as Baby Virginia Corbin. When she was six years old, she starred in fairy-tale films made by the William Fox Company. The success of Jack and the Beanstalk (1917) was such that Fox signed Corbin to a five-year contract. In addition to her salary, the contract specified that the company would provide instruction for her education.  

She went on to become a youthful flapper in the 1920s. She was one of the many silent stars that would not make it in the sound era, and retired from acting in the early 1930s.

Corbin was named one of the WAMPAS Baby Stars of 1925. She also had a nervous breakdown in 1925, causing her to miss making films. Films in which she starred included Alladin and the Wonderful Lamp,The City That Never Sleeps, Knee High, The Perfect Sap, and Hands Up. Her career ended with her working as an extra in 1940.

Personal life and death 
She married New York broker Theodore Krol in 1929, retiring from films for the marriage, and they had two children, Harold Phillip and Robert Lee. They divorced in 1937 and shortly after she married another Chicago stockbroker, Charles Jacobson.

Corbin died on June 4, 1942, in Winfield, Illinois, aged 30.

Partial filmography

 Let Katie Do It (1916) – Child (uncredited)
 Intolerance (1916) – Child in Epilogue (uncredited)
 Pidgin Island (1916) – Minor Role (uncredited)
 Heart Strings (1917) – Johanna – as a child
 Vengeance of the Dead (1917, Short)
 Jack and the Beanstalk (1917) – Virginia / Princess Regina
 Aladdin and the Wonderful Lamp (1917) – Princess Badr al-badr
 The Babes in the Woods (1917) – Rose / Gretel
 Treasure Island (1917) – Louise Trelawney
 Six-Shooter Andy (1918) – Susan's Sister (uncredited)
 Ace High (1918) – Annette Dupre (child)
 Fan Fan (1918) – Fan Fan
 The Forbidden Room (1919) – Virginia Clark
 The White Dove (1920) – Dorothy Lanyon
 Enemies of Children (1923)
 The Cafe of Fallen Angels (1923)
 Fight and Win (1924)
 Wine of Youth (1924) – Flapper
 Sinners in Silk (1924) – Flapper
 The City That Never Sleeps (1924) – Molly Kendall
 Broken Laws (1924) – Patsy Heath – age 16
 The Chorus Lady (1924) – Nora O'Brien
 Three Keys (1925) – Edna Trevor
 The Cloud Rider (1925) – Blythe Wingate
 Lilies of the Streets (1925) – Judith Lee
 Headlines (1925) – 'Bobby' Dale
 The Handsome Brute (1925) – Nelly Egan
 North Star (1925) – Marcia Gale
 Hands Up! (1926) – Alice Woodstock
 The Honeymoon Express (1926) – Becky
 Ladies at Play (1926) – Dotty
 The Whole Town's Talking (1926) – Ethel Simmons
 The Perfect Sap (1927) – Ruth Webster
 Driven from Home (1927)
 Play Safe (1927) – Virginia Craig
 No Place to Go (1927) – Virginia Dare
 The Head of the Family (1928) – Alice Sullivan
 Bare Knees (1928) – Billie Durey
 The Little Snob (1928) – Jane
 Jazzland (1928) – Martha Baggott
 Footlights and Fools (1929) – Claire Floyd
 Knee High (1929)
 Morals for Women (1931) – Maybelle
 Shotgun Pass (1931) – Sally Seagrue
 Forgotten Women (1931) – Sissy Salem
 X Marks the Spot (1931) – Hortense
 Letter of Introduction (1938) – Woman at Barry's Party (uncredited)
 Adventure in Diamonds (1940) – Nightclub Woman (uncredited) (final film role)

References

Further reading
 

 Dye, David. Child and Youth Actors: Filmography of Their Entire Careers, 1914–1985. Jefferson, NC: McFarland & Co., p. 43.

External links

 
 Virginia Lee Corbin – From 'Emotional Star' to 'Flapper.'
 
 Virginia Lee Corbin at Virtual History

American silent film actresses
American child actresses
American film actresses
20th-century deaths from tuberculosis
1910 births
1942 deaths
People from Prescott, Arizona
Tuberculosis deaths in Illinois
20th-century American actresses
WAMPAS Baby Stars